thumb
Sankili may refer to:
 Cankili I
 LOKESH Sankili, Srikakulam